Amanita pachycolea, commonly known as the western grisette or the Stuntz's great ringless amanita, is a species of agaric fungus in the family Amanitaceae. It was recognized as a distinct species by mycologist Daniel Elliot Stuntz, and published in 1982 by Harry Delbert Thiers. Found in western North America, it associates with conifers in coniferous and mixed forests. Amanita pachycolea is classified in Amanita section Vaginatae, which includes species with conspicuous radial striations on the cap (8–20 cm wide), inamyloid spores, and the absence of a ring on the stipe (10–25 cm long, 1–3 cm wide, tapering upward). The mushroom is edible, but not recommended due to possible confusion with toxic Amanita species.

The cap is brown, sometimes lighter near the margin. The gills are white with gray-brown edges, staining orange-brown in age. The stipe is white to brownish with a fibrillose or scaly surface. The base is enclosed by a thick, felty volva, which is white in youth, then yellow or brownish, sometimes becoming reddish in age.

See also

List of Amanita species

References

External links

pachycolea
Fungi of the United States
Fungi described in 1982
Fungi without expected TNC conservation status